Several ships have been named :

 JDS Kiri (PF-291), a Kusu-class patrol frigate of the Japan Maritime Self-Defense Force, formerly USS Everett (PF-8)

See also 
 Kiri (disambiguation)

Imperial Japanese Navy ship names
Japanese Navy ship names